Mount Crockett is a prominent peak,  high, standing  east of Mount Astor in the Hays Mountains of the Queen Maud Mountains. It was discovered by members of the geological party under Laurence Gould during the Byrd Antarctic Expedition, 1928–30, and named by Richard E. Byrd for Frederick E. Crockett, a member of that party. The application of this name has been shifted in accord with the position assigned on the maps resulting from the second Byrd Antarctic Expedition of 1933–35.

References 

Mountains of the Ross Dependency
Amundsen Coast